Trite is a genus of jumping spiders first described by Eugène Simon in 1885. Most of the 18 described species occur in Australia and New Zealand, with several spread over islands of Oceania, one species even reaching Rapa in French Polynesia.

Species
According to the World Spider Catalog in October 2018, there were twenty one recognised species:
 Trite albopilosa (Keyserling, 1883) – New South Wales, Victoria
 Trite auricoma (Urquhart, 1886) – New Zealand
 Trite caledoniensis Patoleta, 2014 – New Caledonia 
 Trite concinna Rainbow, 1920 – Lord Howe Island, Norfolk Island
 Trite gracilipalpis Berland, 1929 – Loyalty Islands
 Trite grayi Richardson, 2016 –  Lord Howe Islands 
 Trite guilberti Patoleta, 2014 –  New Caledonia
 Trite herbigrada (Urquhart, 1889) – New Zealand
 Trite ignipilosa Berland, 1924 – New Caledonia
 Trite lineata Simon, 1885 – New Caledonia
 Trite longipalpis Marples, 1955 – Samoa, Tonga
 Trite mustilina (Powell, 1873) – New Zealand
 Trite ornata Rainbow, 1915 – South Australia
 Trite parvula (ppBryant, 1935) – New Zealand
 Trite pennata Simon, 1885 – New Caledonia
 Trite planiceps Simon, 1899 – New Zealand
 Trite pollardi Patoleta & Żabka, 2017 – New Zealand
 Trite ponapensis Berry, Beatty & Prószyński, 1997 – Caroline Islands
 Trite rapaensis Berland, 1942 – Rapa
 Trite simoni Patoleta, 2014 – New Caledonia, Loyalty Islands
 Trite urvillei (Dalmas, 1917) – New Zealand

References

External links
 Photograph of T. planiceps

Salticidae
Spiders of Oceania
Salticidae genera